Pretty Dudes is an American LGBTQ digital dramedy created by Chance Calloway that tells the story of a group of friends in Southern California who navigate in and out of platonic and romantic relationships. Predominantly featuring an inclusive and intersectional cast and crew, the series stars an ensemble that includes Xavier Avila, Tiffany Commons, Bryan Michael Nuñez, Kyle Rezzarday, Manny Shih, Joshuah Noah Snel, Aria Song, Tae Song, Yoshi Sudarso, and Olivia Thai. Pretty Dudes aired initially on YouTube and streams on Amazon Prime Video and VOD service Stoopid Ambitious as of 2019.

Premise
Set in the greater Los Angeles area, the series follows a group of millennial friends of varying races, genders, and backgrounds as they navigate platonic and romantic relationships. Photographer Zario (Bryan Michael Nuñez), business law student Ellington (Xavier Avila), gamer Alexander (Kyle Rezzarday), and doumi Jay (Tae Song) live with model Sunji (Yoshi Sudarso), where they are frequently visited by hard-drinking neighbor Eagle (Olivia Thai). After entering a bet to get Zario a new boyfriend, resentments and betrayals cause friction in the group. The second season expands the main group to include painter Kish (Tiffany Commons), art gallery owner December (Aria Song), Ellington's younger brother Marshall (Joshuah Noah Snel), and December's younger brother Boaz (Manny Shih).

Cast and characters

Main cast

Recurring

 Stacy Snyder as Mandy
 Cesar Cipriano as Shane Cortez
 Chelsea Gray as Ty
 Kelsey Toussant as Calligraphy "Callie" Reynolds
 Stanley Wong as Erwin Lee
 Leo Lam as Gregory
 Carlin James as Elijah
 Nicko Sabado as Lando
 Courtney Grant as Tevin
 Sammy Cantu as Ken Dahl (season 2)
 Charlit Dae as Ram Takada (season 2)
 Tatiana A. Lee as Geneva Fauntleroy (season 2)
 Anthony Ma as Michael Michigan (season 2)
 Brennan Mejia as Carver Gomez-Pacheco (season 2)
 Peter Adrian Sudarso as Quincy (season 2)
 Angelique Maurnae as Armoni Chantal (season 2)
 Henita Telo as Fable (season 2)
 Amira Gray as Nia (season 2)
 Dickie Hearts as Chance (season 1)
 Michael Bow as Genie (season 1)
 Clifford Cisneros as Zach Largaespada (season 1)
 Tony Garbanzos as Patrick (season 1)
 Beau Sia as Stranger (season 1)

Guest
 Dion Basco as Samuel ("All-American Type")
 Osric Chau as Vincint ("The Death of Romeo")
 Giovannie Espiritu
 Wilson Lai as Korey ("Spectrum")
 Avalon Penrose as White Kish ("Chicos Lindos")

Episodes

Season 1

Season 2

Soundtrack

Season 1
 How We Break ("Pretty Dudes" Anthem) by Matt Almodiel, Chance Calloway and Peter Su
 Overthinking by COAH
 Man Made Mess by Tim Be Told
 Invisible World (Disappear) by Paul Dateh
 Stuck On You by Marc Hightower
 What You Have by Nathan Ray Penland
 Old-Fashioned Love by Peter Su
 Underneath by Brandyn Burnette
 Wasted by Tim Be Told
 Orion by Ryan Mitchell Grey
 Change the World by Sivan Levi
 Santa Barbara by Peter Su

Season 2
 How We Break (A.J. Sealy Remix) by Matt Almodiel, Chance Calloway and Peter Su
 Nobody Freakin''' by Megan Vice

Short films and other media

Pretty Dudes: Caught Gay-HandedCaught Gay-Handed was the very first Pretty Dudes-related project, released April 30, 2017.

How We Break ("Pretty Dudes" Anthem)
Chance Calloway and Gerry Maravilla co-directed the Malibu-set music video for the series anthem. Featuring Nuñez in an unnamed role implied to be Zario, other cast members also appear in the video alongside the song's singers Matt Almodiel, Calloway and Peter Su. The song and several remixes were released as an EP compilation.

Pretty Dudes: The Double Entendre
Containing two episodes, "Bravo Double Delta" and "Brother's Keeper," this short was co-written by all of the season 2 writers, Chance Calloway, Christopher Edelen, and Andrea Lee.

This short doesn't seem to be in canon with the actual plot of season 2. Among other things, The Dude House is a different location, singer Tanerélle plays Kish (actress Tiffany Commons has been cast in the same role for season two), and Sammy Cantu plays a character named Aza Keeper, where his season two character is named Ken Dahl.

Pretty Dudes: The Novel
A novelization of the first season was released on July 7, 2020.

Reception
Critical reception
The show's first season received a positive response from critics who mostly praised its diversity and inclusive storylines. Philip Hernandez of Black Talent TV called Pretty Dudes "a one a kind web series." Asyiqin Haron of Geeks of Color called the show "incredibly diverse," highlighting the "great storytelling." It was listed as one of "9 Dope, Black Web Series To Dive into for the Summer" by Shadow and Act, called "extraordinary" and "the rare series that showcases nuanced friendship between gay and straight men" by Jordan Simon who went on to add, "If you love Noah's Arc, you will enjoy this.". While noting that Pretty Dudes seemed "created for the gay male and female gaze," Devin Randall complimented the "truly fleshed out story" in a review for Instinct Magazine. RIZEup Magazine called the series "trendsetting." In a negative review, queerguru'' said the series has a "lightweight plot" "intended to be watched only by other millenials."

Awards and nominations

References

External links 
 
 

2015 American television series debuts
2010s American comedy-drama television series
English-language television shows
LGBT African-American culture
2010s American black sitcoms
Asian-American television
2010s American LGBT-related comedy television series
2010s American drama television series
American comedy web series
2010s American single-camera sitcoms
YouTube original programming
American LGBT-related web series